Munit is a Papuan language of Papua New Guinea.

References

Kokon languages
Languages of Madang Province